The Arquelio Torres Ramírez Coliseum (Spanish: Coliseo Arquelio Torres Ramírez) is a sports arena in San Germán, Puerto Rico also known as "La Cuna" or "El hogar del monstruo naranjado".  It has capacity for 5000 persons.  It has recently been remodeled in preparation for the 2010 Central American and Caribbean Games. The basketball club Atléticos de San Germán host their home games at the Coliseum.

References

Buildings and structures in San Germán, Puerto Rico
Indoor arenas in Puerto Rico
Basketball venues in Puerto Rico
2010 Central American and Caribbean Games venues
1985 establishments in Puerto Rico